Farmingdale is a historic railroad station in Farmingdale, New York, along the Main Line (Ronkonkoma Branch) of the Long Island Rail Road. It is located just east of Secatogue Avenue, on South Front Street and Atlantic Avenue. The station has two platforms (north and south), with an underground pedestrian walkway connecting them. The station house is on the south platform. Parking is available on both sides of the tracks.

History
Farmingdale station was originally opened on October 15, 1841, when the Long Island Rail Road first went through the village. It was rebuilt in July 1875 and again in 1890. An electric sub-station was added between 1908 and 1909 for the Huntington Railroad. During the Ronkonkoma electrification, the station was officially in electrified service in June 1987, while east of the station was not officially in service until December 1987. On November 13, 1991, it was added to the National Register of Historic Places.  In 1996, federal funding from the Intermodal Surface Transportation Efficiency Act was obtained to restore the station building.

During the 2002 US Open and 2009 US Open golf tournaments at Bethpage State Park, the station was used by spectators as a transfer point to shuttle buses to Bethpage Black Course. In 2009, approximately 29 percent of all attendees arrived via the Long Island Rail Road.

Station layout
This station has two high-level side platforms, each 12 cars long. Westbound trains generally serve Platform A and eastbound trains Platform B, though some weekday trains stop at the opposite platform. Farmingdale is the eastbound terminal for select weekday trains.

Parking is available on both sides of the tracks, and requires either a permit from the Village of Farmingdale (available to residents and non-residents) or payment at parking meters. Meter regulations are not enforced on weekends. Another parking lot exists west of the station along Front Street and behind private property along the west side of Elizabeth Street. Village permits are also required for this parking lot.

References

External links 

Farmingdale Station Historic Images (TrainsAreFun.com)
Farmingdale Station Historic Images (Arrt's Arrchives)
Unofficial LIRR History Website
View from parking lot
Victorian Clock Tower
Bike Racks
Southeast view from north platform
FARM Interlocking (The LIRR Today) and Pinelawn Wye (The LIRR Today)
 Station from Secatogue Avenue from Google Maps Street View

Long Island Rail Road stations in Nassau County, New York
Oyster Bay (town), New York
Railway stations in the United States opened in 1841
Railway stations on the National Register of Historic Places in New York (state)
National Register of Historic Places in Oyster Bay (town), New York